Yemi Ajibade (28 July 1929 – 24 January 2013), usually credited as Yemi Goodman Ajibade or Ade-Yemi Ajibade, was a Nigerian playwright, actor and director  who, after settling in England in the 1950s, made significant contributions to the British theatre and the canon of Black drama. As an actor he is well-known for Dirty Pretty Things (2002), The Exorcist: The Beginning (2004) and Danger Man (1964). In a career that spanned half a century, he directed and wrote several successful plays, as well as acting in a wide range of drama for television, stage, radio and film.

Biography and education
Adeyemi Olanrewaju Goodman Ajibade was born a royal prince of the house of Ọ̀ràngún from Ìlá Òràngún, Osun State, in the south-west of Nigeria. He attended Abeokuta Grammar School – where his love for the theatre began – and later pursued studies in London, at Kennington College of Law and Commerce (1955), at The Actors' Workshop (1960), and from 1966 to 1968 at the London School of Film Technique (now the London Film School), where he was a contemporary of filmmaker Horace Ové (who has recalled that they were the only two black students in the school at the time).

Career and works 
From early in his stay in the UK, Ajibade acted in radio drama for the BBC African Service. As producer Fiona Ledger recalled in 2007: "It was back in 1960 that the late BBC producer John Stockbridge was asked by the Head of the African Service to devise some kind of drama for African listeners. He came up with a series, a soap opera set in London. No copy survives, but" Yemi Ajibade "took the role of a social worker, moving around England and settling quarrels."

Continuing to develop his acting career, he was hailed in 1963 as "one of the most promising actors from West Africa". Alongside performers who included Yulisa Amadu Maddy, Leslie Palmer, Eddie Tagoe, Karene Wallace, Basil Wanzira, and Elvania Zirimu, among others, Ajibade featured in a production of Lindsay Barrett's Blackblast! filmed in 1973 for a special edition of the BBC Two arts and entertainment programme Full House devoted to the work of West Indian writers, artists, musicians and film-makers.

Ajibade's acting portfolio would eventually encompass roles in television series such as Armchair Theatre (starring in 1963 in The Chocolate Tree by Andrew Sinclair, together with Earl Cameron and Peter McEnery), Danger Man (1965), Dixon of Dock Green (1968), Douglas Botting's The Black Safari (1972), The Fosters (1976), Prisoners of Conscience (1981), and Silent Witness (1996), and work on the stage – for instance, in "Plays Umbrella", a season of five specially commissioned new plays, at Riverside Studios (in association with Drum Arts Centre, London) in August 1980, and Nicholas Wright's plays One Fine Day (1980 at Riverside Studios) and The Custom of the Country (1983 at The Pit, Barbican Centre), and in Lorraine Hansberry's Les Blancs (Royal Exchange Theatre, 2001) – as well as film appearances including in Terence Fisher's The Devil Rides Out (1968), Monte Hellman's Shatter (1974), Hanif Kureshi's London Kills Me (1991), Skin (1995, written by Sarah Kane), Dirty Pretty Things (2002), Exorcist: The Beginning (2004) and Flawless with Demi Moore and Michael Caine (2007).

In 1966 Ajibade led a delegation of British, West Indian and African members to the World Festival of Black Arts in Dakar, Senegal, directing a production of Obi Egbuna's play Wind Versus Polygamy; at the 2nd World Black Arts Festival in Lagos in 1977 Ajibade was supervisor of Drama Events. In 1975 he was appointed as a tutor by the Inner London Education Authority, and he also became artistic director of the Keskidee Centre in north London, where he directed a production of Wole Soyinka's The Swamp Dwellers (13–23 March 1975).

Among Ajibade's best known work as a playwright is Parcel Post, which had 29 performances by the English Stage Company at the Royal Court Theatre in 1976–77, directed by Donald Howarth, with a cast featuring the likes of Rudolph Walker, Christopher Asante, and Taiwo Ajai (who has said that her own acting career started by chance "when she stumbled across Yemi Ajibade on a production"). Ajibade's subsequent plays included Fingers Only (originally entitled Lagos, Yes Lagos when it was broadcast by the BBC in 1971 and published in Nine African Plays for Radio in 1973), which in its 1982 production for the Black Theatre Co-operative (now NitroBeat) was directed by Mustapha Matura at The Factory Theatre, Battersea Arts Centre, and Albany Empire. Waiting for Hannibal opened in June 1986 at the Drill Hall, followed by a national tour, with Burt Caesar and Ajibade directing a cast that included Judith Jacobs, Wilbert Johnson and others; and A Long Way From Home was produced by Nicolas Kent at the Tricycle Theatre in 1991, with Ajibade himself heading the cast.

Ajibade also worked in Ibadan during the late 1970s, as a writer and director (1976–79) with the Unibadan Masques, the University of Ibadan's School of Drama acting company.

In February 2008, at an All-Star Gala held at Theatre Royal Stratford East on the 10th anniversary of Tiata Fahodzi, Ajibade was honoured as a leader of British-African theatre, alongside Taiwo Ajai-Lycett, Dotun Adebayo, Dona Croll, Femi Oguns, Chiwetel Ejiofor, Hugh Quarshie and others.

Personal life
Ajibade, who had three sisters (Arinade Victoria, Layo and Janet),he has two sisters that were late (Bolanle and Fadeke) and a brother Sunday was married to actor and poet Ebony White, with whom he had two daughters, Adenrele and Mimi, and from a previous relationship he had another daughter, Marigold. He died in the UK on 13 January 2013 at the age of 83.

Plays

 Award (unproduced)
 Behind the Mountain – first produced: Unibadan Masques, 1977
 Fingers Only – first produced: The Factory, Battersea Arts Centre, London (Black Theatre Co-operative, directed by Mustapha Matura), 1982. As Lagos, Yes Lagos, BBC Radio, 1971.
 A Long Way from Home – first produced: Tricycle Theatre, London (directed by Nicolas Kent), 1991 
 Mokai – first produced: Unibadan Masques, 1979
 Parcel Post – first produced: Royal Court Theatre, London, 16 March 1976
 Waiting for Hannibal – first produced: Drill Hall, London (Black Theatre Co-operative, directed by Ajibade with Burt Caesar), 1986
 Para Ginto (black version of Peer Gynt) – Tricycle Theatre, 1995

Bibliography
 Fingers Only and A Man Names Mokai. Ibadan: Y-Book Drama series, 2001, 142 pp. 
 Parcel Post and Behind the Mountain. Ibadan: Y-Book Drama series, 2001, 147 pp. 
 Gwyneth Henderson and Cosmo Pieterse (eds), Nine African Plays for Radio (includes "Lagos, Yes Lagos" by Yemi Ajibade), Heinemann Educational Books, AWS, 127, 1973.

Partial filmography

1962: The Sword in the Web (TV Series) - Jean
1963: Suspense (TV Series) - Joshua
1963: Armchair Theatre (TV Series) - Jacob Jones
1964: Festival (TV Series) - Aide to Lichee
1964: Espionage (TV Series) - Sergeant
1965: The Wednesday Play (TV Series) - Rebel soldier / Man in pub
1965: Danger Man (TV Series) - Barman
1966: The Witches - Mark (uncredited)
1967: Theatre 625 (TV Series) - Tsilla Mamadou
1967: Thirty-Minute Theatre (TV Series) - Observer
1968: 30 Is a Dangerous Age, Cynthia - New Lodger (uncredited)
1968: The Devil Rides Out - African (uncredited)
1968: Dixon of Dock Green (TV Series) - Roger Bunda
1969: The Power Game (TV Series) - Premier of Malta
1970: Carry On Up the Jungle
1972: The Black Safari (TV Movie)
1973: Full House (TV Series) - Black Blast! cast member
1974: Shatter - Ansabi M'Goya / Dabula M'Goya
1976: Shades of Greene (TV Series) - 1st Head boy
1976: The Fosters (TV Series) - Mr. Fuller
1981: Prisoners of Conscience (TV Series) - Walter Sisulu
1987: Truckers (TV Series) - Watchman
1989: Behaving Badly (TV Mini-Series) - Church Elder
1991: Smack and Thistle (TV Movie) - Pedro
1991: London Kills Me - Tramp 
1993: Rwendo (Short)
1995: Skin (Short) - Neville
2002: Dirty Pretty Things - Mini Cab Driver (as Ade-Yemi Ajibade)
2004: Exorcist: The Beginning - Turkana Shaman
2007: Silent Witness (TV Series) - Samson Moyo
2007: Flawless - Guinean Negotiatior (final film role)

References

External links
 
 Yemi Ajibade at Dollee.com
 WorldCat.
 Records of the Black Theatre Co-operative – Nitro Theatre Company, The National Archives.
 "Yemi Ajibade", Black Plays Archive, National Theatre.
 Yemi Ajibade actor credits, Filmography at Cineplex.

1929 births
2013 deaths

20th-century British dramatists and playwrights
20th-century British male writers
20th-century British writers
20th-century Nigerian male actors
Alumni of the London Film School
Black British cinema
Black British male actors
Black British writers
British male dramatists and playwrights
Male actors from Osun State
Nigerian dramatists and playwrights
Nigerian emigrants to the United Kingdom
Nigerian film directors
Nigerian male television actors
Nigerian princes
Nigerian royalty
Nigerian theatre directors
University of Ibadan people
Yoruba dramatists and playwrights
Yoruba male actors
Yoruba princes